The 2011 A Lyga was the 22nd season of the A Lyga, the top-tier football league of Lithuania. The season began on 12 March 2011 and ended on 6 November 2011.  Ekranas were the defending champions, having won their third consecutive title at the end of the 2010 season.

Teams
The league will see a change in the number of teams once again as twelve teams were granted a licence for 2011, one more than in the 2010 season.

FK Vėtra were expelled over financial troubles after 16 matches of the 2010 season; their records were annulled and the team was subsequently disbanded. From the remaining ten clubs, Atletas Kaunas, who finished in last place at the end of the season, were the only team not to apply for a 2011 top-level licence. Atletas therefore played at the second level in 2011.

Three new teams were admitted to the league, unbeaten 2010 I Lyga champions FBK Kaunas, seventh-placed team Atlantas Klaipėda and Dainava Alytus, a merger between I Lyga runners-up Alytis Alytus and third-placed city rivals Vidzgiris. FBK Kaunas and Atlantas made their return after two seasons in the lower divisions of the Lithuanian league system, while Dainava had their debut in the A Lyga, as neither of its predecessor clubs played at the Lithuanian top level in its history.

League table

Results
Teams played each other three times, either twice at home and once away or vice versa, for a total of 33 matches per team.

Matches 1–22

Matches 23–33

Top goalscorers
Including matches played on 6 November 2011; Source: Lietuvos futbolo statistika

References

External links
 Official site 

LFF Lyga seasons
1
Lith
Lith